Major General Edwin Tivey,  (19 September 1866 – 19 May 1947) was an Australian stockbroker and a senior officer in the Australian Army during the First World War.

References

1866 births
1947 deaths
Australian Companions of the Distinguished Service Order
Australian Companions of the Order of St Michael and St George
Australian Companions of the Order of the Bath
Australian generals
Australian military personnel of the Second Boer War
Australian military personnel of World War I
Australian stockbrokers
Military personnel from Victoria (Australia)
People educated at Wesley College (Victoria)
People from Inglewood, Victoria